The 2019 CS Autumn Classic International was held in September 2019 in Oakville, Ontario. It was part of the 2019–20 ISU Challenger Series. Medals were awarded in the disciplines of men's singles, ladies' singles, and ice dance.

Entries
The International Skating Union published the list of entries on August 13, 2019.

Changes to preliminary assignments

Results

Men

Ladies

Ice dance

References

2019 in figure skating
2019 in Canadian sports
Sport in Ontario
Autumn Classic International
CS Autumn Classic International